Dhamaka is an Indian restaurant in New York City. The restaurant is run by Chintan Pandya and Roni Mazumdar of hospitality group Unapologetic Foods.

History and focus
The restaurant's founders, Chintan Pandya and Roni Mazumdar, initially planned to open the restaurant in the summer of 2019, and announced their plans to do so in February 2019. Pandya and Mazumdar, respectively the chef and owner of Dhamaka, had previously collaborated on restaurants Rahi and Adda. The founders pushed the goal of opening in 2019 to early 2020, and later fall 2020; the restaurant ultimately opened in February 2021. The delays in 2020 were due to the COVID-19 pandemic. The restaurant is in Essex Market.

The restaurant's popularity has received coverage in the press. Richard Morgan, writing for Eater, highlighted the restaurant's Rajasthani khargosh dish, a whole rabbit, as "perhaps the most impossible-to-order dish in NYC". The restaurant serves the dish only once a night, and diners must pre-order and pre-pay for the dish.

The restaurant's founders aim to highlight regional Indian dishes rather than focusing on either northern or southern Indian foods.

Reception and accolades
Pete Wells, restaurant critic for The New York Times, gave Dhamaka a positive review. Wells was unable to order the rabbit, and Richard Morgan attributed the popularity of the dish in part due to this failure. In a later review of Semma, another restaurant run by Unapologetic Foods, Wells praised the "rustic cooking" featured at Dhamaka as its primary strength, while asserting that Semma was distinguished by its "chutneys...sauces...and spices" and its more extensive offerings.

The restaurant was nominated for the James Beard Foundation's Best New Restaurant award in March 2022.

References

2021 establishments in New York City
Indian-American culture in New York City
Restaurants in Manhattan
Restaurants established in 2021
Lower East Side
Indian restaurants in the United States

External links